The 1974 Virginia Slims of Newport, was a women's tennis tournament played on outdoor grass courts at the Newport Casino in Newport, Rhode Island in the United States that was part of the 1974 Virginia Slims World Championship Series. It was the fourth edition of the tournament and was held from August 22 through August 26, 1974. First-seeded Chris Evert won the singles title and earned $4,500 first-prize money.

Finals

Singles
 Chris Evert defeated  Betsy Nagelsen 6–4, 6–3
 It was Evert's 13th singles title of the year and the 36th of her career.

Doubles
 Lesley Charles /  Sue Mappin defeated  Gail Chanfreau /  Julie Heldman 6–2, 7–5

References

Virginia Slims of Newport
Virginia Slims of Newport
1974 in sports in Rhode Island
August 1974 sports events in the United States